Constantin Olteanu (6 January 1946 – 17 April 2021) was a Romanian football defender. He was the father-in-law of Florin Motroc and grandfather of Vlad Motroc who were also footballers.

International career
Constantin Olteanu played three games for Romania's Olympic team at the 1972 Summer Olympics qualifiers.

Honours
Argeș Pitești
Divizia A: 1971–72

References

External links
Constantin Olteanu at Labtof.ro

1946 births
2021 deaths
Romanian footballers
Olympic footballers of Romania
Association football defenders
Liga I players
FC Argeș Pitești players
Footballers from Bucharest